A donor offspring, or donor conceived person, is conceived via the donation of sperm (sperm donation) or ova (egg donation), or both (either from two separate donors or from a couple).

For donor conceived people, the biological parent(s) who "donated" sperm or eggs (though most commonly "donors" are financially compensated so "donor", while the most common term is a misnomer) are not legally recognized as parents and do not appear on their birth certificate. In many countries it is common for donor conceived people to be given no identifying information about their donor, however in some countries anonymous sperm and/or egg donation has been made illegal due to concerns for the medical and emotional needs of donor conceived people. Even in cases with anonymous donors, donor conceived people are sometimes able to connect with biological parent(s) and/or half siblings conceived from the same donor using DNA testing or through online registries for donor conceived people.

With the significant increase in the numbers of donor-conceived individuals (38,910 live babies were born in 2005 as a result of 134,260 ART cycles performed at reporting U.S. clinics in 2005, compared with 20,659 babies born as a result of 64,036 ART cycles in 1996), many have questioned the ethics surrounding the technologies and human decisions surrounding donor conception, and there has been plenty of controversy.  For example, the term "Snowflake baby" was coined in reference to unused frozen embryos (left over from other couples' attempts to conceive through in vitro fertilization) that have been "adopted" by families. Abortion opponents tend to support such adoptions.

"ART Cycles" are not accurate as many people (<40%) who use IVF (egg donation) do not report their births, and that there is no tracking or record keeping required for children born from sperm donation.  Estimates of 30,000-60,000 often used are from estimates made with incomplete records from the mid 1980s.

Psychological and social

The psychological and social impacts of assisted reproductive technologies (ART) on donor-conceived children and their families has gained a great deal of interest in recent years as this population has continued to grow. An increasing number of family-support organizations strongly encourage parents to openly discuss their children's origins, whether through donor insemination or following treatment with donated gametes, because research suggest that donor conceived people who learn the nature of their conception at a young age do not suffer psychologically but that those who learn about their conception at a later age may feel lied to or betrayed.

For most sperm or egg recipients, the choice between anonymous sperm or egg donor and a non-anonymous one is generally not of major importance. For some donor conceived children, on the other hand, it may be psychologically burdensome not having the possibility of contacting or knowing almost nothing about the donor. Thus far, studies have found that a significant number of donor conceived children want information about their donor

Donor and sibling tracking
There are donor sibling registries matching genetic siblings and donors. However, with modern information technology, there are other ways of getting information.

One study estimated that approximately 67% of donor conceived children in adolescence with an identity-release donor plan on contacting him when they are eighteen years old.

Registries

Donor registration facilitates donor conceived people, sperm donors, and egg donors establishing contact with genetic relatives. They are mostly used by donor conceived people to find genetic half-siblings from the same egg or sperm donor.

Some donors are non-anonymous, but most are anonymous, i.e. most donor conceived people don't know the identity of their donors. Still, they may be able to obtain unique donor numbers or known donor characteristics, e.g. hair, eye, and skin colors, from fertility clinics to find matched genetic half-siblings.

The largest donor registry is the Donor Sibling Registry (DSR) however there are also many other registries and sometimes registries for siblings set up by the clinic themselves.

Clinics or sperm banks
Clinics and sperm banks facilitate the transaction that allows for prospective parents to become pregnant with donated gametes. They recruit and screen donors and advertise their product to prospective parents. Their position as a middleman is what makes anonymous sperm donation possible, though many clinics and sperm banks also offer non-anonymous donors, where donor conceived people may get the identity of their donors. The most common type of non-anonymous donor is an identity-release donor, which allows offspring to receive identifying information (such as name, phone number, and/or email address) upon their 18th birthday but there are also donors who share identifying information from the beginning. Identity release donors can have some issues, as the donor’s contact information may change between the donation and the child’s 18th birthday or the donor may pass away.

Many people fear that if anonymous donation is made illegal, the number of donors will decrease and there will not be enough supply however, an Australian study concluded that potential donors who would still be willing to donate without a guarantee of anonymity were not automatically more open to contact with offspring. Most potential donors would be willing to meet offspring in a single contact. In addition after anonymous donation was banned in the UK, donations actually increased

DNA testing
Due to the advent of genetic genealogy and DNA databases, even sperm donors who have not initiated contact through a registry are now increasingly being traced by their offspring. In the current era there can be no such thing as guaranteed anonymity as it is now possible for "anonymous" sperm donors to be identified by their offspring. Possibly the first such case was in 2005, when it was revealed in New Scientist magazine that a fifteen-year-old had used information from a DNA test and the Internet to identify and contact his sperm donor.

In 2018, it was reported that DNA testing has led to a significant increase in donor-conceived people finding their siblings and sperm donors.

Controversy 
Within groups of donor conceived people there is controversy regarding the practice of donor conception and anonymity. Some donor conceived people feel frustrated with the circumstances of their conception, particularly if they were conceived anonymously, because they wish to learn more about their biological family but they find themselves without the means to do so. They may feel that their parents, who often chose donor conception over adoption because of desire for a biological connection, are hypocritical in choosing an anonymous donor and preventing them from connecting to biological relatives. On the other hand, some primarily feel grateful that donor conception allowed for their existence and are less interested in the biological family. And yet others don't consider it much or feel neutral. Overall however, most donor conceived people are at least somewhat interested in their biological family and believe that the fertility industry needs greater regulation.

See also
Egg donor
Sperm donation
Accidental incest
Dibling

References

External links
 Information for donor conceived people – UK Regulator (Human Fertilisation and Embryology Authority)

Family law
Human reproduction
Sperm donation
Fertility medicine
Donor conceived people